Sefid Kamar (also Romanized as Sefīd Kamar; also known as Asem Kamar, Esmīshamr, Ismichamr’, and Ismishamar) is a village in Mishu-e Jonubi Rural District, Sufian District, Shabestar County, East Azerbaijan Province, Iran. At the 2006 census, its population was 648, in 189 families.

References 

Populated places in Shabestar County